Porpax exilis is a species of plant within the orchid family. It is native to India.

References

Flora of India
exilis